Novogremyachenskoye is a rural locality (a selo) and the administrative center of Novogremyachenskoye Rural Settlement, Khokholsky District, Voronezh Oblast, Russia. The population was 1,642 as of 2010. There are 26 streets.

Geography 
Novogremyachenskoye is located on the right bank of the Don River, 27 km southeast of Khokholsky (the district's administrative centre) by road. Ustye is the nearest rural locality.

References 

Rural localities in Khokholsky District